Raedieahkka or Radien-akka is a goddess in the Sami mythology.  She is the wife of the Sami high god Radien-attje,  and the mother of Rana Niejta and Raediengiedte.

She and her husband are described as the two divinities who created the world and the human soul together.

See also
Akka (Spirit)

References

Sámi goddesses